Wilhelm Schmidding from Bodenbach, Germany, was a World War II constructor of rocket engines used for RATO. Factories were in Schmiedeberg, and from summer 1943, in Buschvorwerk (Riesengebirge, Niederschlesien, today Krzaczyna).

Engines
 Schmidding 109-513, two solid fuel fitted to the Henschel Hs 293H anti-ship missile.
 Schmidding 109-533, four jettisonable RATO  (1.200 kp, 11,768 kN, 10 seconds) fitted to the Bachem Ba 349 point defence vertical takeoff (VTO) interceptor.
 Schmidding 109-543, rocket motor for the Henschel Hs 298 guided bomb.
 Schmidding 109-553, Solid-fuel rocket booster used for the Henschel Hs 117 "Schmetterling" surface-to-air guided missile.
 Schmidding 109-563, RATOG booster.
 Schmidding 109-573, underwater propulsion gas generator.
 Schmidding 109-593, RATOG booster.
 Schmidding 109-603, fitted to the 8-344 Ruhrstahl X-4 air-to-air missile.

Applications
Bachem Ba 349
Henschel Hs 117
Henschel Hs 293H variant
Henschel Hs 298
Ruhrstahl X-4
Zeppelin Fliegende Panzerfaust
Zeppelin Rammer

References

External links
 Planewrecks 
  

Engineers from Rhineland-Palatinate
20th-century German engineers
Year of birth missing
Year of death missing
People from Vulkaneifel